Rowdy No.1 is a 1988 Indian Telugu-language action film directed by S. S. Ravichandra, produced by K. V. V. Satyanarayana for Sri Sowdamini Creations. The film stars Krishna, Radha, Sarada, and Kaikala Satyanarayana with musical score by Raj–Koti duo. The film turned out to be a successful venture.

Cast 
 Krishna as Bhagawan
 Radha as Sandhya
 Sarada as S.P. Sharvani
 Kaikala Satyanarayana as S. Sivalingeswara Rao
 Nutan Prasad as Tiger Nagaraju
 Gollapudi Maruti Rao as Kongajapam Koteswara Rao
 Sutti Veerabhadra Rao as Meesala Venkatappaiah
 Jayamalini as Meesala Venkatappaiah's wife
 Sakshi Ranga Rao as Avadhani
 Narra Venkateswara Rao as Sub-Inspector of Police
P.J. Sarma as Judge
Tyagaraju as I.G. Prabhakar Rao
K.K. Sarma as Constable

Music 

Raj–Koti duo scored and composed the film's soundtrack.
 "Andamaina Adapilla" — S.P.B., S. Janaki
 "Jai Bolo" — S.P.B., K. S. Chithra
 "Sogase Unnadanni" — S. Janaki
 "Yendayyo" — S.P.B., S. Janaki
 "Yenduko Cheema" — S. Janaki, S.P.B.

References

External links 
 

1988 action films
Indian action films
Films set in Andhra Pradesh
1988 films
1980s Telugu-language films
Films directed by S. S. Ravichandra